Queen Wonyong of the Jeongju Yu clan was a Goryeo royal family member as the granddaughter of King Daejong, son of King Taejo who became the 5th wife of her half first cousin once removed, King Hyeonjong which she then followed her grandmother's clan, the "Jeongju Yu".

Her husband's mother, Grand Queen Mother Hyosuk was initially her paternal aunt, while his first and second wife was initially her first cousin (her uncle's daughters). Yu entered the palace in 1013 (4th year reign of King Hyeonjong) as his fifth wife and was posthumously honoured as Queen Wonyong (원용왕후, 元容王后) later. They didn't have any children.

References

External links 
Queen Wonyong on Goryeosa .
Queen Wonyong on Encykorea .
원용왕후 on Doosan Encyclopedia .

Year of birth unknown
Year of death unknown
Consorts of Hyeonjong of Goryeo
11th-century Korean women